Pteria was the capital of the  Assyrians in northern Cappadocia. They were said by Herodotus to have been taken and ruined by Croesus in 547 BCE. It also was the place of the Battle of Pteria, an undecided battle between Cyrus the Great and Croesus.

Stephanus of Byzantium cites two towns with this or a similar name: a Pterium, which he calls a town of the Medes, and Pteria, a town in the territory of Sinope.

Its site is located near Kerkenes Dağ, Asiatic Turkey.

External links
 The Histories of Herodotus By Herodotus, Henry Cary
 2002 Times Online report on possible site find

References

Populated places in ancient Cappadocia
Former populated places in Turkey
History of Yozgat Province